Lauren Fagan is an Australian operatic soprano.

Fagan grew up in Sydney, and received a business degree in Australia, before studying at London's Guildhall School of Music and Drama, and joining The Royal Opera's Jette Parker Young Artists Programme.

References

External links
 
 Lauren Fagen at HarrisonParrott

Australian operatic sopranos
Living people
Singers from Sydney
Alumni of the Guildhall School of Music and Drama
Year of birth missing (living people)
21st-century Australian women opera singers